Vito Schlickmann (28 December 1928 – 14 February 2023) was a Brazilian Roman Catholic prelate.

Schlickmann was born in Brazil and was ordained to the priesthood in 1954. He served as titular bishop of Gurza and as auxiliary bishop of the Roman Catholic Archdiocese of Florianópolis, Brazil, from 1995 until his retirement in 2004.

References

1928 births
2023 deaths
Brazilian Roman Catholic bishops
Bishops appointed by Pope John Paul II
People from Florianópolis